Johnson Creek is a stream in northeast Lawrence County of southwest Missouri. It is a tributary of Turnback Creek.

The stream source lies northwest of Chesapeake and the stream flows northeast turning north as it flows under Interstate 44 and then northwest to its confluence with Turnback Creek just south of Missouri Route 96 between the communities of Paris Springs and Spencer.

Johnson Creek has the name of the local Johnson family.

See also
List of rivers of Missouri

References

Rivers of Lawrence County, Missouri
Rivers of Missouri